The Syracuse Mets are a Minor League Baseball team of the International League and the Triple-A affiliate of the New York Mets. They are located in Syracuse, New York, and play their home games at NBT Bank Stadium, which opened in 1997 and has a seating capacity of 10,815. The Mets are named for their major league affiliate and owner, the New York Mets.

Throughout most of its existence, from 1934 to 1996 and again from 2007 to 2018, the team was known as the Syracuse Chiefs, while from 1997 to 2006 it was known as the Syracuse SkyChiefs. The club was rebranded as the Syracuse Mets in October 2018.

History

Syracuse Chiefs

Establishment (1934–1957) 
The Syracuse Chiefs baseball team was established in 1934, when the Jersey City Skeeters moved to Syracuse and were renamed the Chiefs. The team played in the International League (IL) through 1955. They won five Governors' Cup championships during this stretch, including back-to-back championships in 1942 and 1943. The team was then sold and moved to Miami as the Marlins for the 1956 campaign. Another team known as the Syracuse Chiefs competed in the Class A Eastern League (then two levels below the IL) in 1956 and 1957, but moved to Allentown, Pennsylvania, on July 13, 1957. The Chiefs played at MacArthur Stadium from 1934 to 1996, moving to new then-P&C Stadium (1997–2005) in 1997.

Restart and multiple affiliations (1961–1978) 
Syracuse was without professional baseball from 1957 until 1961, when the Montreal Royals franchise was abandoned by its owners (the Los Angeles Dodgers) and relocated to Syracuse as the top affiliate of the Minnesota Twins, becoming the Syracuse Chiefs. After that, the team had affiliations with the New York Mets and Washington Senators (1962), the Detroit Tigers (1963,) and the New York Yankees (1967–1977). Baseball has been played in Syracuse without interruption since the rebirth of the Chiefs in 1961.

Toronto Blue Jays (1978–2008) 
From 1978 to 2008, the Chiefs were the Triple-A affiliate of the Toronto Blue Jays. The three-decade Toronto–Syracuse affiliation is the longest of the 11 major league affiliations the team has had since 1936. While the Chiefs reached three Governors Cup finals during this time, many of the players who helped lead the Blue Jays to consecutive World Series titles in 1992 and 1993 passed through Syracuse. In 1994, outfielder Shawn Green hit .344 for the Chiefs, winning the International League batting title and the International League Rookie of the Year Award. The team was renamed the SkyChiefs in 1997 before reverting to simply "Chiefs" in December 2006.

Washington Nationals (2008–2018) 
On September 20, 2008, the Chiefs signed a two-year affiliation agreement with the Washington Nationals, ending their relationship with the Blue Jays. That first season, the players wore a decal on their uniforms with the letters "HB" to commemorate Harold Berman, former member of the team's board of directors, who died after the 2007 season. In 2009, the Chiefs wore a decal on their uniforms with the letters "HM" to commemorate Hy Miller, former state assemblyman and former member of the team's board of directors, who died after the 2008 season.

In 2010, the Chiefs celebrated their 50th season of community-owned baseball (1961–2010), wearing 1961 jerseys for every Thursday home game. The team brought back radio announcers from the past, such as Dan Hoard and Syracuse University alumnus Sean McDonough. They had a 76–67 win–loss record, with pitching prospect Stephen Strasburg winning two games and losing one in five appearances.

In 2011, the Chiefs, wore throwback jerseys for every Thursday home game to commemorate the 35th anniversary of their last International League Governors' Cup championship team (managed by Syracuse Wall of Fame member Bobby Cox). The Chiefs added four alternate jerseys to their rotation for the season: one for Latin American Day, a second for Jackie Robinson Day (commemorating Negro league uniforms), a third for national holidays such as Independence Day and Memorial Day, and a fourth for Breast Cancer Awareness Night. The team played the Pawtucket Red Sox on August 20 at Fenway Park as part of a doubleheader in conjunction with the sixth annual Futures at Fenway event, featuring games involving Boston Red Sox minor league teams. The Chiefs, behind starter Brad Meyers, defeated the PawSox 3–1 before more than 29,000 fans. At Alliance Bank Stadium (now NBT Bank Stadium) the Chiefs added a "Home Plate Club" to the stadium: premium seating in the first four rows behind home plate, with waitstaff for merchandise, food and drinks.

On May 14, Chiefs DH Michael Aubrey went four for four, hitting four home runs in an 11–0 victory over the Durham Bulls and becoming the second player in team history to hit four home runs in a game; Gene Locklear was the first, on July 14, 1977. On August 27, Stephen Strasburg pitched his only rehab game for the Chiefs, against the Rochester Red Wings. Giving up two hits in the sixth inning (his only hits allowed before departing, with the Chiefs leading 1–0), he received no decision in Syracuse's 4–3 win. It did, however, clinch the Chiefs' third Thruway Cup victory; the team's other wins were in 1999 and 2010. The club's record for the season was 66–74, 14 games out of first place and fourth place in the six-team North Division.

On April 5, 2012, the Chiefs opened at home against the Rochester Red Wings. Top draft pick Bryce Harper, later that month promoted to the Nationals, made the opening-day roster. Randy Knorr did not return for a second season as manager, and Tony Beasley was promoted from the Harrisburg Senators. The Chiefs played all 16 of their games against the Scranton/Wilkes Barre Yankees at the now renamed Alliance Bank Stadium (2005–2013) due to stadium renovations at the Yankees' ballpark in Moosic, Pennsylvania. On May 7, the Chiefs unveiled a new high-definition video board in left field, replacing the board which had been in place since the stadium's 1997 opening.

The 2013 season, with manager Tony Beasley in his second season with the team, began on April 4 in Allentown, Pennsylvania, against the Lehigh Valley IronPigs; the Chiefs' home opener was eight days later against the IronPigs. On Throwback Thursdays, the team wore jerseys from 1983 to 1996.

On September 30, 2013, it was announced that 16-year general manager John Simone and any family members associated with the team, including assistant GM Mike Vounitas, were fired. On October 8, former Auburn Doubledays general manager Jason Smorol became the Chiefs' GM, with Jason Horbal as his assistant. It was the first time since 1970 that someone not named Simone was general manager of Syracuse; John Simone had taken over the job from his father, Anthony (Tex) Simone, in 1997.

The Chiefs opened their 2014 season on April 3 with a loss at home to the Scranton/Wilkes-Barre RailRiders and finished the season with the best record (81–62) in the International League, clinching a playoff spot for the first time since 1998 and the first IL North Division title since 1989. NBT Bank Stadium hosted its first ever playoff game on September 5, 2014, a 7–6 loss to the Pawtucket Red Sox which capped off a 3–0 first round series sweep for the Red Sox. The season featured an aggressive promotional campaign, including Social Media Monday, Two-for-One Tickets on Tuesday, Winning Wednesday, Dollar Thursday, Fireworks Friday, Giveaway Saturday, and Family Sunday. The Chiefs sold out the outfield wall, the dugouts, and the field tarp, earning $500,000 in advertising.

Following the 2014 season, the Chiefs would not make the playoffs during the final years of the Nationals' affiliation, including a 54–87 record during the 2017 season, their worst since 1966. Many prospects passed through Syracuse on their way to the MLB, including Trea Turner, Lucas Giolito, and Victor Robles. Randy Knorr replaced Gardner Jr. after 4 seasons as Chiefs' manager for the 2018 season, his second stint with the Chiefs.

Syracuse Mets 
The chief operating officer of the New York Mets, Jeff Wilpon, joined Governor Andrew Cuomo and Joanie Mahoney, Onondaga County Executive, at NBT Bank Stadium on October 11, 2017, to announce that the Mets would purchase the Chiefs from the Community Baseball Club of Central New York in early 2018. Under the deal, the Chiefs' affiliation with the Washington Nationals continued through the end of the 2018 season, with the Chiefs becoming the Mets' Triple-A affiliate beginning with the 2019 season. The team was rebranded as the Syracuse Mets, adopting the New York Mets' blue, orange, and white color scheme along with new logos and uniforms on October 16, 2018.

The Syracuse Mets started their 2019 inaugural season with one of the most experienced rosters in the minor leagues. Of the 25 players on the roster, 21 of them had previously played in the majors. They had combined for 7,006 total games. The Opening Day roster consisted of veteran outfielders Carlos Gómez and Rajai Davis, former Syracuse Chief Danny Espinosa, catcher René Rivera, and cult-star outfielder Tim Tebow. The Mets played their first game on April 4, against the Pawtucket Red Sox in front of an Opening Day home crowd of 8,823 fans. Syracuse took a 3–2 lead in the bottom of the sixth inning, but Pawtucket tied the game in the top of the eighth. The PawSox scored three more runs in the top of the tenth, defeating the home team, 6–3. The Mets' first win came in game one of a doubleheader on April 6 in which they defeated Pawtucket, 6–3 in 7 innings.
In that same first Mets win, with one out in the bottom of the fourth inning, Dilson Herrera hit the Syracuse Mets first home run.

On May 31, 2019, Travis Taijeron hit the first cycle in Syracuse Mets history in a 13–4 win over the PawSox. It was the first in franchise history since 1987. Rubén Tejada also hit for the cycle on June 19, 2019 against the Charlotte Knights. Despite his efforts, the Mets lost 9–7.

At the 2019 All-star break, the Mets were 42–47, good for 5th place in the IL North Division. After August 7, they made up 6.5 games in the standings to put themselves in a share of the division lead with the Scranton/Wilkes-Barre RailRiders after sweeping a doubleheader versus the Lehigh Valley IronPigs on August 26. They also had a winning season for the first time since 2014. Syracuse went into the final weekend of the 2019 season tied with Scranton/Wilkes-Barre for the division lead. Both teams split both of their respective series' to stay tied for the division lead. The two teams played a one-game tie breaker in order to decide who would win the division, and ultimately make the playoffs. The Mets would lose the one-game tiebreaker by a score of 14–13. Syracuse had led 13–6 going into the bottom of the eighth inning, but Scranton/Wilkes-Barre would come back and score eight runs in the bottom half of the inning to eventually win the game, effectively eliminating the Mets from qualifying for the playoffs.

The 2020 season was cancelled due to the COVID-19 pandemic. In conjunction with Major League Baseball's restructuring of Minor League Baseball in 2021, the Mets were organized into the 20-team Triple-A East. The start of the season was pushed back to May.

Aside from winning on 2021 Opening Day, the Mets got off to a slow start, ending the month of May with an 8–16 record. The struggles continued in the month of June, where they endured a 15-game losing streak from June 6 to June 24. The 2021 regular season will be followed by the Triple-A Final Stretch, a 10-game tournament among all 30 Triple-A clubs, wherein the team with the best winning percentage over that stretch will receive a prize from Major League Baseball.

On August 29, 2021, the Syracuse Mets tied with the Rochester Red Wings to finish a game for the first time in franchise history. With the game tied at 3 in the bottom of the 7th inning, a 40-minute rain delay was in place before the game was called due to the rain. The game was ruled as a tie because the two teams would not play each other again that season.

In 2022, the Triple-A East became known as the International League, the name historically used by the regional circuit prior to the 2021 reorganization.

Roster

Corporate structure

New York Mets 
In October 2017, the New York Mets, headed by then-Mets owner Jeff Wilpon, agreed to purchase the Chiefs for approximately $18 million pending approval by team shareholders. A vote was held on November 17, 2017, in which 88 percent of shareholders voted in favor of selling the team, thus meeting the required two-thirds vote needed for approval. The Mets organization assumed ownership in early 2018.

Community Baseball Club, Inc. 
Prior to the Mets' purchase, the franchise was owned by the Community Baseball Club of Central New York, Inc., "a community-owned club, controlled by a [13-person] board of directors," acting on behalf of approximately 4,000 shareholders, who together held 15,857 shares from 1961 to 2017.

According to Dick Ryan, a former club chairman of the board and treasurer, a majority of the Community Baseball Club shares were "owned by people who own one or two shares." Shares in the club were first sold in 1961, at a price of $10 each; as of 2011, shares had a resale value of approximately $126, but were not publicly traded. A provision in the Chief's certificate of corporation stated that "no one may vote more than 500 shares." This provision was intended to make it difficult for the club to be sold and moved to another location, as happened earlier in its history.

Management 
Officers of the Community Baseball Club of Central New York, Inc., included:

 Robert F. Julian, Chairman of the Board
 William Dutch, President
 Jason Smorol, General Manager

Among those serving on the organization's Board of Directors were Stephen A. Rogers, Chairman, Syracuse Media Group; and Crandall Melvin III, "a software executive from Syracuse and the team's largest single shareholder with 502 shares."

Dutch was a partner in Chiefs First LLC, an investment company established in September 2013, which loaned the Chiefs $500,000 in return for 600 shares and controlled the team's 13-member board.

Finances 
The Chiefs operated at a loss from 2006, except for the 2010 season when they ended the season $100,000 in the black. The team lost $973,516 in the 2013 season, on operating expenses of $3.1 million. Under general manager Jason Smorol, their losses were reduced to $241,584 in 2014, and $169,011 in 2015.

Due to the COVID-19 pandemic, the cancelled 2020 Minor League Baseball season, and the delayed start to the 2021 Minor League Baseball season, the Syracuse Mets lost about $5 million, according to general manager Jason Smorol.

Attendance

Top season attendance

NBT Bank Stadium 

 1999: 446,025
 2001: 423,405
 1998: 420,488
 2010: 416,382
 2002: 413,566
 2000: 402,450
 1997: 400,804
 2009: 392,518
 2008: 392,028
 2005: 382,896
 2007: 380,152
 2004: 364,648
 2003: 356,303
 2006: 347,699
 2013: 345,047
 2019: 327,478
 2016: 274,427
 2015: 262,408

* Includes playoffs

MacArthur Stadium 

 1994: 368,971*
 1991: 307,922
 1995: 300,589
 1996: 300,405
 1992: 276,786
 1993: 265,486
 1970: 257,650*
 1990: 250,048
 1989: 233,161*
 1985: 232,073*
 1971: 216,115*
 1987: 211,315
 1964: 208,956*
 1975: 201,725*
 1977: 200,302
 1981: 198,101
 1979: 196,228*
 1976: 196,121*
 1980: 189,250
 1986: 187,758
 1988: 184,967
 1973: 184,461
 1982: 184,297
 1974: 182,082*
 1963: 180,971*
 1972: 179,048
 1983: 163,859
 1978: 160,427
 1967: 152,781
 1969: 152,201*
 1965: 152,072*
 1968: 150,295
 1984: 142,571
 1961: 126,016
 1966: 106,669

* Includes playoffs

Top 40 attendance dates since 1961

 May 7, 2010 (14,098)
 May 24, 2010 (13,288)
 July 17, 1993 (13,124)
 May 29, 2010 (13,115)
 July 17, 1967 (13,082)
 July 25, 1967 (13,063)
 August 17, 1995 (12,711)
 July 30, 2010 (12,674)
 June 28, 1995 (12,659)
 July 4, 2015 (12,526)
 July 14, 2001 (12,455)
 June 28, 2001 (12,368)
 August 17, 1999 (12,344)
 August 22, 1972 (12,322)
 August 16, 1961 (12,321)
 August 14, 2009 (12,288)
 May 30, 2018 (12,269)
 July 11, 1998 (12,255)
 July 23, 1994 (12,224)
 August 1, 2008 (12,208)
 July 13, 2001 (12,121)
 April 3, 1997 (12,112)
 May 29, 1994 (12,112)
 July 4, 2019 (12,063)
 July 4, 2014 (12,045)
 July 18, 1994 (11,899)
 July 11, 1994 (11,679)
 August 20, 1994 (11,485)
 August 9, 1963 (11,476)
 August 30, 1994 (11,469)
 July 10, 1995 (11,455)
 May 9, 1970 (11,398)
 June 25, 2002 (11,356)
 June 29, 2000 (11,295)
 August 18, 1999 (11,228)
 June 22, 1999 (11,219)
 July 13, 1970 (11,144)
 June 27, 1977 (11,100)
 May 5, 2006 (11,012)
 July 16, 1981 (10,835)

Titles and pennants

Syracuse Chiefs

Governors' Cup 
The Chiefs won the Governors' Cup (the IL championship) 8 times, and played in the championship series 17 times.

 
1935 – Defeated Montreal, 4–2
1942 – Defeated Jersey City, 4–2
1943 – Defeated Toronto, 4–1
1946 – Lost to Montreal, 4–3
1947 – Defeated Buffalo, 4–1
1948 – Lost to Montreal, 4–0
1951 – Lost to Montreal, 4–3
1954 – Defeated Montreal, 4–2
1964 – Lost to Rochester, 4–1
1969 – Defeated Columbus, 4–1
1970 – Defeated Columbus, 4–1
1974 – Lost to Rochester, 4–3
1975 – Lost to Tidewater, 4–3
1976 – Defeated Richmond, 4–1
1979 – Lost to Columbus, 3–1
1994 – Lost to Richmond, 3–0 (All games aired on ESPN, due to the MLB strike.)

The Chiefs won the International League pennant — finishing the regular season with the best record in the league — eight times.

Junior World Series 
The Chiefs played in the Junior World Series five times, winning it once, in 1970 against the Omaha Royals, 4–1.

Season standings

All-time records 
Note: One playoff series is missing from the original Syracuse Chiefs. It will be added to the records when found.

Notable people

Players

 

Richard Bleier 
A. J. Burnett
Robinson Canó
Chris Carpenter
Kevin Cash
Bobby Cox
Jacob deGrom
Carlos Delgado
Tony Fernández
Lucas Giolito
Shawn Green
Carlos Gomez
Ron Guidry
Roy Halladay
Bryce Harper
Aaron Hill
Matt Kemp
Jimmy Key
Adam Lind
Gene Locklear
Fred McGriff
Denny McLain
Thurman Munson
Stu Pederson
Anthony Rendon
Goody Rosen
Víctor Robles
Deion Sanders
Hank Sauer
Travis Snider
Jhonatan Solano
Luis Sojo
Ed Sprague Jr.
Stephen Strasburg
Dave Stieb
Tim Tebow
Trea Turner
Alex Ríos
David Wells
Vernon Wells
Jayson Werth

Broadcasters

 Marv Albert (1962)
 Hank Greenwald (1962)
 Greg Papa (1982–83)
 Sean McDonough (1982–84), current ESPN play-by-play man for Major League Baseball, NCAA Men's Basketball, NCAA Football, and the National Football League
 Dan Hoard (1985–95), former Cincinnati Reds fill in broadcaster, now voice of the Cincinnati Bengals
 Ken Levine (1988), film and television writer who also broadcast for the Baltimore Orioles, 1991, Seattle Mariners, 1992–94, 2011–12, San Diego Padres, 1995–1997, Los Angeles Dodgers, 2008–2010
 Matt Vasgersian (1995)
Bob McElligott (2000–2009), radio broadcaster for the Columbus Blue Jackets
 Jason Benetti (2009–2014), broadcaster for the Chicago White Sox
Kevin Brown (2010–2017) 
Michael Tricarico (2018–Present)

Retired numbers and recognized people

Game broadcasts 
Locally games are broadcast on the Mets' flagship radio station, WSKO "The Score" 1260 AM, and globally online via SyracuseMets.com. In addition, all games are broadcast on MiLB.TV, an internet video subscription service. Select games were broadcast live on Spectrum Sports, provided on Spectrum Cable services throughout the Central and Northern New York area until Spectrum ceased operations of its sports channels in the state sometime around 2017. The games on Spectrum Sports were called by Steve Grilli, Syracuse Wall of Fame member and former major leaguer. All games against thruway rivals Rochester or Buffalo were broadcast on Spectrum Sports and fed between the cities, with the host city providing the presentation and announcers.

In popular culture

Writer Ken Levine based the Springfield Isotopes minor league team in The Simpsons episode Dancin' Homer on experiences as an announcer for the Syracuse Chiefs. The episode includes references to former announcer Dan Hoard and owner Anthony "Tex" Simone (named Antoine "Tex" O'Hara in the episode).

The Chiefs gained national media attention for a promotion planned for 2014's Tattoo Appreciation Night, where anyone who got a tattoo of their "C" logo would receive free tickets to Chiefs games for life.

See also 

 Star Park
 Syracuse Baseball Wall of Fame
 Syracuse Orange baseball

References

External links

 Official website
 Gersbacher, Ron. (2012). "History of Syracuse Baseball, 1858 to Present"
 Photographs of Alliance Bank Stadium, home of the Syracuse Chiefs – Rochester Area Ballparks

 
Baseball teams established in 1934
Eastern League (1938–present) teams
International League teams
Toronto Blue Jays minor league affiliates
Washington Nationals minor league affiliates
New York Mets minor league affiliates
1934 establishments in New York (state)
Triple-A East teams